Koray Avcı (born 1 January 1990) is a Turkish singer.

Life and career 
Koray Avcı was born in Ankara to a family that were originally from Tercan. His father died in 2021 from heart and kidney failure.

In 2008, he was enrolled in Muğla University School of Arts and Sciences to study physics. In 2010 and while still studying in Muğla, he took part in Yetenek Sizsiniz Türkiye, where he famously imitated Volkan Konak and got to the second round. Upon his graduation in 2012, he returned to Ankara and started performing music on the streets. In the same year, he rose to prominence after a video of him singing at a metro station was shared on the social media. He released his first studio album Aşk İle in 2015, which topped the sales charts in Turkey. Its lead single "Sen" garnered over 200 million views on YouTube. The album consisted of a number of new songs as well as covers. The album's success led to the release of other studio albums in the following years, including Sonra Dersin Ki in 2016, Senin İçin Değer in 2018, and Seni Çok Özlüyorum in 2020.

Discography

Studio albums

Singles

As featured artist

Music videos

References

External links 

1990 births
Living people
Alevi singers
Turkish Alevis
Turkish clarinetists
Turkish folk musicians
Turkish male singers
Performers of Sufi music